Heinz Höhne (1926 Berlin, Germany - 27 March 2010 in Großhansdorf) was a German journalist who specialized in Nazi and intelligence history.

Biography 
Born in Berlin in 1926, Höhne was educated there until he was called to fight during the last months of the Second World War. After the war, he studied journalism in Munich and went on to work for various newspapers as a freelance reporter. In 1955, he was hired by the weekly magazine Der Spiegel, where he joined the foreign staff of the magazine and eventually took charge of the Anglo-American department.

Höhne's efforts covered Nazi history. His work is entitled The Order of the Death's Head: The Story of Hitler's SS. (Der Orden unter dem Totenkopf: Die Geschichte der SS). This work first appeared in 1967, and other works subsequently followed, such as his 1971 study of the Soviet Union's spy network entitled Codeword: Direktor.

In 1976, Höhne went on to write Canaris, an interpretation of Hitler's spymaster, who was in charge of the Abwehr.

There are a number of references to Höhne's work on the SS by other historians who have written on Nazi Germany. More recently, Adrian Weale's work, Army of Evil: A History of the SS frequently cites Höhne's The Order of the Death's Head: The Story of Hitler's SS, although challenging some of the assertions found therein.

Another work from Höhne is Krieg im Dunkeln (1985), which examines the centuries-old relationship between Russian and German intelligence. After his retirement, Höhne worked on a history of the Third Reich, the first volume of which, Gebt mir vier Jahre Zeit, appeared in 1996.

Höhne's book, The General Was a Spy: The Truth about General Gehlen and his Spy Ring, received a less than glowing review from a CIA analyst.

References

Bibliography
The Order of the Death's Head: The Story of Hitler's SS. (Der Orden unter dem Totenkopf: Die Geschichte der SS) First published in 1967. 
SS a Ordem Negra (1970)
Codeword: Direktor. (1971)
  (American edition of Pullach Intern, 1971, which was originally a series of articles for Der Spiegel, according to the book's front pages)
Canaris (1976)
Krieg im Dunkeln (1985)
Gebt mir vier Jahre Zeit (1996)

20th-century German historians
Journalists from Hamburg
Historians of espionage
2010 deaths
1926 births
German male non-fiction writers
Der Spiegel people